Perfecto may refer to:

People
 Gregorio Perfecto (1891–1949), Filipino journalist, politician and jurist
 Mariano Perfecto (1853–1913), Filipino politician, writer, and father of Gregorio Perfecto
 Martín Perfecto de Cos (1800–1854), 19th-century Mexican general
 Perfecto de Castro ("Perf"), multi-awarded Filipino musician
 Saint Perfecto (died 850), Spanish saint; one of the Martyrs of Córdobaa
 Perfecto Yasay Jr. (1947–2020), Filipino bureaucrat and former Secretary of Foreign Affairs of the Philippines

Entertainment
Perfecto, the 1990s remix team consisting of Paul Oakenfold of Perfecto Records and others
 Perfecto Records, a British record label founded by trance DJ Paul Oakenfold in 1989
Perfecto Fluoro, a compilation album by Paul Oakenfold
Perfecto Presents Ibiza, a remix album by Paul Oakenfold
Perfecto Presents: Sandra Collins, an LP in the techno music style
Perfecto Presents: Sandra Collins Part 2, a mix created by DJ Sandra Collins
Perfecto Presents: The Club, a mix compilation album mixed by Paul Oakenfold
Perfecto Presents: Travelling, a remix album by Paul Oakenfold
 
 Planet Perfecto, a dance "supergroup" formed in 1997 by Paul Oakenfold, Ian Masterson and Jake Williams

Other
Gregorio Perfecto High School, a high school in Juan Luna, Tondo, Philippines 
 Perfecto, a shape or type of cigar
Perfecto motorcycle jacket, a brand of double style leather motorcycle jackets manufactured by American clothing company Schott NYC
USS Perfecto (SP-86), a patrol boat in the United States Navy during World War I
St. Louis Perfectos (1899), a former name for the St. Louis Cardinals
 Perfecto Technologies, an applications security company, later renamed to Sanctum

See also
 Perfecta (disambiguation)
 Perfetto, a Spanish-language album by Eros Ramazzotti